The Diamond League Shanghai is an annual athletics event at the Shanghai Stadium in Shanghai, China as part of the Diamond League. The meeting was founded as the Shanghai Golden Grand Prix in 2005. The meet assumed its current name in 2010.

From 2005 to 2009 the IAAF classified the Shanghai Golden Grand Prix among IAAF Grand Prix and IAAF Super Grand Prix meetings. It's the only meeting of the Diamond League that features and guarantees Men's 110 m Hurdles in every edition of the League.

Meeting Records

Men

Women

References

External links 
 Diamond League - Shanghai Official Web Site
 Shanghai Golden Grand Prix web site until 2009

Diamond League
IAAF Grand Prix
Sports competitions in Shanghai
Recurring sporting events established in 2005
2005 establishments in China
Xuhui District